Titanic II (also styled Titanic 2) is a 2010 American drama disaster film written, directed by and starring Shane Van Dyke and distributed by The Asylum. Despite the title, it is not a sequel to the 1997 critically acclaimed film, but is a mockbuster of it. It was released direct-to-TV in Australia on 7 August 2010. It premiered on Syfy, on Sky in the UK and Ireland on 9 August. It was released on 25 August in the United States to critically negative response, though the film's ensemble cast performances, particularly that of Bruce Davison, received praise.

The film is set on a fictional replica Titanic that sets off exactly 100 years after the original ship's maiden voyage to perform the reverse route, but global warming and the forces of nature cause history to repeat itself on the same night, only on a more disastrous and deadly scale. A supernatural horror-themed sequel, Titanic 666, was released twelve years later, on April 15, 2022.

Plot
In the Arctic waters near the Helheim Glacier in Greenland, a person is surfing on waves created by falling chunks of ice that fall off the glacier and into the ocean caused by the effects of global warming. However, a very large chunk of ice falls into the water, creating an especially large wave. The surfer tries to escape from the wave, but it is far too fast for him, and in a matter of seconds, it catches up to him and then drowns and kills him. United States Coast Guard Captain James Maine, is sent to investigate in Greenland. While he is there with Dr. Kim Patterson (Brooke Burns), a huge chunk of ice falls into the ocean.

On 10 April 2012, 100 years after the departure of the RMS Titanic on its maiden voyage, a new, similar-looking luxury cruise liner, the RMS Titanic II, is christened. She embarks on her maiden voyage using the same route the Titanic took 100 years before, albeit in reverse direction (from New York City to Southampton). The ship's captain Will Howard (D.C. Douglas) is in command. The ship's designer, Hayden Walsh (Shane Van Dyke), and the ship's nurses Amy Maine (Marie Westbrook) and Kelly Wade (Michelle Glavan) are on board. During the Atlantic crossing, the crew is alerted of the tsunami by James Maine. Maine warns that any ice in the area will be moved with the tsunami. In a rush to get back to shore, one of the engines is damaged. Immediately following, the wave and a large iceberg ram into the ship, leaving many passengers injured. The entire starboard side of the ship and the starboard lifeboat ramps are crushed. Hayden and Amy return below decks and find Kelly badly injured. The three escape and move towards the upper decks. Meanwhile, back up north, a much larger tsunami is created by yet another glacier. During the evacuation, immense pressure is placed on the ship's turbines, causing it to eventually explode, killing many passengers and crew, including the ship captain Will Howard. The explosion also causes an immense fire on the Titanic II, which is sinking by its bow (similar to the first Titanic) while also listing at a shallow angle to its starboard side.

Amy gets a call from her father, who warns her of the second wave and to stay out of the lifeboats, as they will be washed away by the wave. Maine orders the three to move to the ship's onboard diving facility. Kelly is later killed when a very heavy door crushes her. Hayden and Amy make it to the diving facility when they hear somebody trapped. They try to help him, but he dies behind a jammed door. When Hayden and Amy go inside the diving facility, the second wave hits the ship, capsizing it, and destroying the lifeboats.

The ship's diving facility only has one oxygen tank and scuba suit, which Hayden gives to Amy. Before sacrificing his life for her, Hayden kisses Amy and with his last words tells her to resuscitate him should he drown before they are rescued. Captain Maine arrives to rescue Amy and Hayden by swimming inside the ship as it sinks. His helicopter runs out of fuel and crashes as Patterson gets in a life raft. With the ship flooded, Titanic II finally sinks. After James rescues them, Amy attempts to resuscitate Hayden but it's too late. Amy, and an unknown number of injured passengers whom Hayden ordered his helicopter to take (earlier in the film) are the only known survivors of the disaster.

Cast
 Marie Westbrook as Amy Maine, one of the ship's nurses and Hayden's love interest
 Shane Van Dyke as Hayden Walsh, the ship's owner and designer
 Bruce Davison as Captain James Maine, Amy's father and a helicopter commander of the U.S. Coast Guard
 Michelle Glavan as Kelly Wade, another of the ship's nurses and Amy's colleague and friend
 D. C. Douglas as Captain Will Howard, the ship's captain
 Brooke Burns as Dr. Kim Patterson, a glaciologist
 Josh Roman as Elliot Snipes, the pilot of Captain Maine's CH-53 Super Stallion helicopter
 Carey Van Dyke as First Officer Elmer Coolidge
 Dylan Vox as Second Officer Dwayne Stevens
 Wittly Jourdan as Elijia Stacks
 Kendra Waldman as Madeline Kay

Production

RMS Queen Mary docked as a hotel ship and tourist attraction in Long Beach, California was used as a stand-in for RMS Titanic II during the departure scenes and some of its interiors. The ship had previously been used as stand-ins for the fictional similarly fated ocean liner SS Poseidon in The Poseidon Adventure (1972) and the original RMS Titanic in the 1979 television miniseries S.O.S. Titanic.

Reception
The film has received a negative response from most film critics. On the website TheCriticalCritics.com the film was reviewed as being "a mixed bag" since "it’s better than one might expect, but not as good as one might hope." Though panned generally as "pretty lackluster" as well as "riddled with disaster movie clichés", the performances of some cast members were highlighted for praise, particularly Bruce Davison as a veteran U.S. Coast Guard captain. The movie as a whole was given a rating of "Don't Bother".

Dread Central said in a review "Take away the novelty of the 'Titanic II' name, and you’re left with a rather trite Poseidon Adventure-ish disaster flick made on the cheap. It’s not good enough to be engrossing, nor is it made to be intentionally bad, and even as silly as the scenario is, none of it is ever quite silly enough to provide unintentional fun. Action and suspense are constantly hampered by the low budget and the special effects answer the question, "What would James Cameron's Titanic have been like if most of the digital effects looked like animation from a Wii cutscene?"".

, Titanic II has two reviews on Rotten Tomatoes, but does not have an approval rating.

See also
 Titanic 666

References

External links
 
 
 Titanic II at The Asylum

2010 films
2010 independent films
American disaster films
The Asylum films
Mockbuster films
Direct-to-video drama films
Films set in 2012
Films shot in Los Angeles
Films about RMS Titanic
Films directed by Shane Van Dyke
Seafaring films
2010 drama films
2010s English-language films
2010s American films